The New Welfare Party (Turkish: Yeniden Refah Partisi, YRP) is an Islamist political party in Turkey, a successor of The Welfare Party. It was founded by former Prime Minister of Turkey Necmettin Erbakan's son Fatih Erbakan on 23 November 2018. They adopt the National Outlook (Turkish: "Millî Görüş") ideology.

Controversies 
The party's Istanbul Youth-Wing’s Vice President, Sadık Tunç, made controversial comments on the 97th anniversary of the abolishment of the caliphate in Turkey: "The days when we will declare Sharia-e-Ghara-e-Muhammadiyyah are coming closer." The Turkish Constitution forbids proposing or calling the abandonment of Secularism (Laicism), or the abandonment of the law preventing it itself, alongside making the first four articles of the constitution untouchable and unchangeable. Their predecessor was dissolved and banned by the Constitutional Court of Turkey in 1998 due to their Islamist agenda. After the event, Sadık Tunç deleted his tweet on Twitter about the topic.

The chairperson & founder of the newly party, Fatih Erbakan, is also an open supporter of the anti-vax movement during the COVID Pandemic in Turkey, which some specific religious and very-conservative Turks in Turkey are a part of. He claimed COVID-19 vaccines could lead to people giving birth to "half-human, half-monkey" childs. 

He also openly but briefly brought up and discussed/talked about this topic during several occasions on live-TV interviews. He gained many criticisms after these several statements.

Policies
The party was founded with the slogan "We are here for our nation". They specified that their main goals are "First morality and spirituality, then design the new world order under the leadership of Turkey and set up the fair order."

Fatih Erbakan has stated that the new party would replace the current system by a new presidential system, and that returning to a parliamentary system would be harmful. The party also has spread conspiracy theories against GMO seeds and food biotechnology. They will also take a strong anti-Zionist position like their predecessor.

References

External links
New Welfare Party official website

2018 establishments in Turkey
Political parties established in 2018
Political parties in Turkey
Far-right political parties in Turkey
Eurosceptic parties in Turkey
Islamic political parties in Turkey